The Primetime Emmy Award for Outstanding Cinematography for a Limited or Anthology Series or Movie is an annual award presented as part of the Primetime Emmy Awards.

Winners and nominations

1970s

1980s

1990s

2000s

2010s

2020s

Programs with multiple nominations

5 nominations
 Fargo

3 nominations
 Sherlock

2 nominations
 1883
 American Horror Story Black Mirror Into the West John Adams The Pacific Watchmen''

Individuals with multiple wins

5 wins
 Donald M. Morgan

3 wins
 Gayne Rescher

2 wins
 Bill Butler
 Robbie Greenberg
 Philip H. Lathrop
 Woody Omens
 Ted Voigtlander

Individuals with multiple nominations

9 nominations
 Donald M. Morgan

8 nominations
 Gayne Rescher

6 nominations
 Ted Voigtlander

5 nominations
 Robbie Greenberg
 Philip H. Lathrop

4 nominations
 Joseph F. Biroc
 James Crabe
 Dana Gonzales

3 nominations
 Ralf D. Bode
 Bill Butler
 Mike Eley
 Stephen Goldblatt
 Stevan Larner
 Isidore Mankofsky
 Kramer Morgenthau
 Woody Omens
 Robert Primes
 Howard Schwartz
 Ric Waite

2 nominations
 Remi Adefarasin
 John A. Alonzo
 Chuck Arnold
 Alan Caso
 James Chressanthis
 Charles Correll
 Dennis Dalzell
 John C. Flinn III
 Tak Fujimoto
 Ronald Víctor García
 Michael Goi
 Florian Hoffmeister
 Arthur Ibbetson
 Johnny E. Jensen
 Andrew Laszlo
 Steven Meizler
 Gregory Middleton
 Fred Murphy
 Hiro Narita
 Michael D. O'Shea
 Elemér Ragályi
 Vittorio Storaro
 Ivan Strasburg
 Eric Van Haren Noman
 Kees Van Oostrum
 Reynaldo Villalobos
 William Wages
 Vilmos Zsigmond

References

Cinematography for a Limited or Anthology Series or Movie
Awards for best cinematography